Don Juan Gutiérrez de Garibay was a famous Spanish naval commander, Admiral of the Spanish navy, and commander-in-chief of the Spanish treasure fleet, during the Anglo–Spanish War (1585–1604), the Eighty Years' War, and the French Wars of Religion.

External links
Juan Gutiérrez de Garibay 

16th-century Spanish people
17th-century Spanish people
Spanish people of the Eighty Years' War
16th-century births
Year of death missing
People of the French Wars of Religion